Stan Nicholson is a former professional rugby league footballer who played in the 1950s, 1960s and 1970s. He played at club level for Featherstone Rovers (Heritage № 404).

Playing career
Nicholson made his début for Featherstone Rovers on Saturday 4 April 1959, he appears to have scored no drop-goals (or field-goals as they are currently known in Australasia), but prior to the 1974–75 season all goals, whether; conversions, penalties, or drop-goals, scored 2-points, consequently prior to this date drop-goals were often not explicitly documented, therefore '0' drop-goals may indicate drop-goals not recorded, rather than no drop-goals scored.

Challenge Cup Final appearances
Nicholson was a reserve to travel in Featherstone Rovers' 17-12 victory over Barrow in the 1966–67 Challenge Cup Final during the 1966–67 season at Wembley Stadium, London on Saturday 13 May 1967, in front of a crowd of 76,290.

Testimonial match
Nicholson's benefit season at Featherstone Rovers took place during the 1969–70 season.

Genealogical information
Stan Nicholson is the uncle of the rugby league footballer who played in the 1980s for Featherstone Rovers (Heritage № 595); Tony Nicholson.

References

External links

Search for "Nicholson" at rugbyleagueproject.org
Featherstone Rovers Families: Big brother - a featherstone rovers blog

English rugby league players
Featherstone Rovers players
Living people
Year of birth missing (living people)